The Painted Hills, also known as Lassie's Adventures in the Goldrush, is a 1951 drama western film produced by Metro-Goldwyn-Mayer (MGM) and directed by Harold F. Kress.

Adapted by True Boardman from Alexander Hull's novel Shep of the Painted Hills, the film stars Paul Kelly, Bruce Cowling, Ann Doran, and dog actor Pal (credited as "Lassie") in a story about a collie named Shep who seeks revenge after her master is murdered. Technical advisor Nipo T. Strongheart for Native American topics worked with the Miwok people for their role in the movie.

The Painted Hills was the seventh, and final, MGM Lassie film released.

Plot
A prospector named Jonathan Harvey (Paul Kelly), whose faithful companion is a rough collie named Shep, looks after the family of his late partner, Martha Blake (Ann Doran) and her son Tommy (Gary Gray). After years of digging in the hills of California (where the movie was shot), he finally strikes gold. However, before he can share it with the Blakes, his greedy partner Lin Taylor (Bruce Cowling) kills Jonathan and attempts to lay claim on the gold. He poisons Shep, who nearly dies, and nearly kills Tommy, but ultimately Shep recovers and leads Lin into the mountains, where he falls off a cliff to his death.

Main cast

 Pal (credited as "Lassie") as Shep - Hero 
 Paul Kelly as Jonathan Harvey - Good Oldtime Prospector
 Bruce Cowling as Lin Taylor - Gold Fever Bad Partner
 Gary Gray as Tommy Blake - Boy
 Ann Doran as Martha Blake - Tommy's Mom
 Art Smith as Pilot Pete - Parson
 Andrea Virginia Lester as Mita 
 Chief Yowlachie as Bald Eagle - Indian Vet
Brown Jug Reynolds as Red Wing

Music
In 2010, Film Score Monthly released the complete scores of the seven Lassie feature films released by MGM between 1943 and 1955 as well as Elmer Bernstein’s score for It's a Dog's Life (1955) in the CD collection Lassie Come Home: The Canine Cinema Collection, limited to 1000 copies. Due to the era when these scores were recorded, nearly half of the music masters have been lost so the scores had to be reconstructed and restored from the best available sources, mainly the Music and Effects tracks as well as monaural ¼″ tapes.

The score for The Painted Hills was composed by Daniele Amfitheatrof.

Track listing for The Painted Hills (Disc 5)

Main Title/He's a Millionaire - 2:43 
I Need Your Help/Christmas/Hairy Present/Shep's Longing - 4:36 
Back to Jonathan/Montage - 1:28 
Visitor/Pilot Pete - 1:43 
Holy Pete/Good Girl/Foul Play/Shep Follows Jonathan - 9:55 
Hat/He Won't Be Back - 3:08 
Poison/Indians Find Shep - 4:09 
Rescue - 2:04 
Incantation/Shep Lives/Shep Came Back - 3:37 
Tommy Finds the Grave/Taylor Pursues Tommy/Tommy Is Hurt/The Hole/Thy Heavenly Kingdom - 4:55 
Come Along, Son/The Chase—Revised/Freezing Up/Taylor Dies/Happy Ending & End Title - 8:59

Total Time: 47:37

Release
According to MGM records, the film earned $783,000 in the US and Canada and $302,000 elsewhere, leading to a loss of $122,000.

Public domain status
Along with seven other MGM films released the first half of 1951, the copyright on The Painted Hills lapsed after MGM neglected to file the necessary renewal applications in 1979. As such, the film is now part of the public domain and has been released to VHS and DVD by a variety of companies.

In popular culture
The movie was riffed on Mystery Science Theater 3000 (episode 510)

References

External links
 
 
 
 
 
 

1951 films
Films about dogs
Films based on American novels
Lassie films
Metro-Goldwyn-Mayer films
Films scored by Daniele Amfitheatrof
Films shot in California
Films set in California
Films set in the 18th century
1951 directorial debut films
American drama films
1951 drama films
American Western (genre) films
1951 Western (genre) films
1950s English-language films
Films directed by Harold F. Kress
1950s American films